Sathroptera is a genus of flies in the family Stratiomyidae.

Species
Sathroptera flavipes Kertész, 1914

References

Stratiomyidae
Brachycera genera
Taxa named by Kálmán Kertész
Diptera of Asia